Tactusa pars is a moth of the family Erebidae first described by Michael Fibiger in 2010. It is known from western Thailand, western Malaysia and the Chinese provinces of Yunnan and Guizhou.

The wingspan is 10–11 mm. The ground colour of the forewings is yellow, with a very large triangular patch, including the fringes, that extends from the antemedial point on the costa, to the apex and to the tornal edge. There is a light-brown triangular patch present subapically by the costa. Parts of the postmedial and subterminal lines are present and are whitish. The terminal line is indicated by blackish-brown interneural spots. Parts of the fringes are basally whitish, together forming a line. The hindwing is dark grey, with a very faint discal spot and the underside is unicolorous grey.

The biotope is a moist mainly broad-leaf forest with bushes and herbaceous plants, close to a river. All specimens are recorded at light in the middle of September.

References

Micronoctuini
Taxa named by Michael Fibiger
Moths described in 2010